Arthur Gray (1713–1748) along with Thomas Kingsmill were the leaders of the notorious Hawkhurst Gang that operated, from its base in Kent, along the South Coast of England from 1735 until 1750.

He was the eleventh of the thirteen children of William and Mary Gray.

Gray served as an apprentice to a butcher at  Marden near Maidstone, for seven years. He then returned to Hawkhurst, and there carried on his trade (as a butcher) for about three years. He then, by his own admission, spent more and more time in the company of smugglers, although denying smuggling himself. However he was known to be one of the leaders of the Hawkhurst Gang.

Gray was tried for his offences at the Old Bailey and found guilty. He was executed at Tyburn, in London on 11 May 1748 and then gibbeted at Stamford Hill. The following year, Kingsmill, the gang's new leader, and William Fairall were also hung at Tyburn. 

Gray’s body was hung on a double gibbet that had been used before. He was gibbeted next to the body of a murderer. Gray remained in the gibbet until 1752 when his body was finally cut down.

References

English smugglers
History of Kent
History of Sussex
History of Hampshire
History of Dorset
Hawkhurst
1713 births
1748 deaths